TeeKay-421 vzw is the name of a smaller Belgian Star Wars fanclub that publishes four magazines a year, not linked to the international 501st Legion. The fanclub was founded in 1997 by Christiaan Vertez, Laurent Bettens, and Tim Veekhoven.

TeeKay publishes four TeeKay-421 magazines a year (articles, interviews, reviews), organizes club meetings and contests, runs a website, and has held several charity actions. The magazine and website are in Dutch.

History
Founded in 1997, TeeKay became a vzw, meaning a non-profit organization, in 1998. TeeKay's website won the 1999 award of best non-professional website in Belgium.

References

External links
TeeKay-421: The Belgian Star Wars Fanclub
TeeKay-421 on Facebook
TeeKay-421 on Wookieepedia

Star Wars fandom
1997 establishments in Belgium
Organizations established in 1997